Ouchi Dam is a dam in Fukushima Prefecture, Japan. It supports a 1000 MW hydroelectric power station.

References

Dams in Fukushima Prefecture
Dams completed in 1991
1991 establishments in Japan